0x is an open-source, decentralized exchange infrastructure that enables the exchange of tokenized assets on multiple blockchains. Developers can use 0x to incorporate exchange functionality into their applications, and market makers can use 0x to create markets for cryptocurrencies and tokens. ZRX, an Ethereum ERC-20 token, is the native governance and staking token of 0x. Individuals who own ZRX can vote on protocol changes and stake their tokens to earn liquidity rewards in Ether (ETH). The project's creator and core developer is 0x Labs.

History 
Will Warren and Amir Bandeali began the development of the project in 2016, and on February 22, 2017, they released a white paper with the following abstract:

The project conducted an initial coin offering (ICO) on August 15, 2017 where it sold half of the total supply (500M) of its ZRX token in just over 24 hours, raising a total of $24M.

In April 2018, David Sacks, former COO of PayPal, joined 0x's advisory board.

On October 11, 2018, ZRX was the first Ethereum ERC-20 token to begin trading on the US-based cryptocurrency exchange Coinbase.

On June 22, 2020, 0x announced the formation of 0x Labs stating, "As we continue to decentralize control of 0x protocol, the platform will take on an identity of its own and our organization will transition into one of the many productive stakeholders moving the ecosystem forward."

On February 17, 2021, Bitwise, creator and manager of the world's largest crypto index fund, included the ZRX token among its portfolio of cryptoassets for their DeFi Crypto Index Fund.

Partnerships 

When Warren, 33, and Bandeali, 31, met six years ago, they shared a belief that all forms of value, be it traditional assets such as fiat currencies, stocks and bonds or digital collectibles like video game items, would eventually be tokenized. “We envisioned a future where there are billions of these different types of tokens,” says Warren. With this idea in mind, he and Bandeali started 0x Labs, which enables developers and businesses to create new markets for their tokens on major blockchains, including Ethereum and Avalanche. The San Francisco-based firm also operates decentralized exchange (DEX) aggregator Matcha, a search engine of sorts that helps traders optimize costs by showing the best prices across a number of exchanges. Last month, Matcha handled approximately $1 billion of the total $5.2 billion in DEX aggregator trading. In April, 0x partnered with Coinbase, the largest cryptocurrency exchange in the U.S., to power Coinbase’s new marketplace for NFTs.

0x Labs, the architect of Web3 exchange infrastructure 0x, has raised $70M in a Series B round led by Greylock. Other investors in the round include Pantera, Sound Ventures, A.Capital, Jump Crypto, OpenSea, Coinbase, Brevan Howard, Reid Hoffman, and Jared Leto.

The funding will fuel the continued growth of the 0x Labs team and its product and service offerings, including Matcha, the search engine for tokens; 0x API, supplying multi-chain aggregated liquidity as a service; and 0x Protocol, the open-source, global backbone for decentralized exchange. The company also plans to continue integrating new chains, including non-EVM ones such as Solana, invest in cross-chain functionality, expand its newly introduced support for NFT swaps, and deliver an even higher level of support to integrators.

0x currently supports 7 major blockchains: Ethereum, Polygon, Fantom, Avalanche, Optimism, BNB Chain, and Celo, and its ecosystem has been rapidly expanding. With integrations across all of the top wallets and apps, including MetaMask, Coinbase Wallet and Coinbase NFT, Polygon Wallet, Brave, Matcha, dYdX, Zapper, Zerion, and Shapeshift, 0x is fast becoming the trusted standard for all decentralized exchange. To date, 0x has enabled over $158B in tokenized value to flow across 43M+ trades. There are 3.5M+ users across all wallets and app integrations that are using 0x for their P2P exchanges.

Sarah Guo, Partner at Greylock, says, “All verticals of Decentralized Exchange exploded in 2021. What’s exciting is that we are still very early on the DEX adoption curve. 0x Labs is at the forefront of that development and is perfectly positioned to lead the Web3 charge as more and more value is tokenized and needs a standard to be moved and exchanged. The 0x Labs team have been around since the early days of Ethereum and play such a significant role in the broader web3 ecosystem. We are really excited to work with the 0x Labs team as they level up Web3.”

Developers use 0x to easily incorporate exchange functionality into their applications and create new markets for all tokenized assets and value, including cryptocurrencies, DeFi tokens, and NFTs.

Amir Bandeali, Co-founder and Co-CEO of 0x Labs says, “0x Labs helps businesses eliminate the complexity of accessing decentralized markets across all layers of the Web3 exchange stack. We provide solutions that make it easy for app developers to incorporate exchange functionality and deliver the best selection of tokens at the best prices to their users. By using 0x technology, businesses will have more time to focus on what matters: their product.”

Will Warren, Co-founder and Co-CEO of 0x Labs, says, “We put our ecosystem of integrators first, because if they succeed, we all succeed. Many of the top crypto companies already use and trust 0x, and we're ready to take the next big step in our mission to ‘build a tokenized world where all value can flow freely’ by onboarding the next 100x wave of users, businesses, and institutions to web3.”

0x Labs has a mission-driven and diverse team composed of top-tier talent from Coinbase, Google, Meta, Bitso, Microsoft, Citi, Spotify and other top companies. The company is remote-first and fully distributed, with team members located across Africa, Asia, Australia, Europe, North American, and South America. Early pioneers in the space, 0x Labs has made significant technical contributions to various Ethereum standards over the years, including helping to establish the NFT token standard (ERC721).

0x raised $15M in a Series A round in 2021, led by Pantera Capital.

References

External links 
 Official website

Blockchains
Ethereum tokens